Volodarsky (masculine), Volodarskaya (feminine), Volodarskoye (neuter), or Volodarskogo (masculine genitive) is the name of several rural localities (settlements, khutors, villages, and logging depot settlements) in Russia:
Volodarsky, Astrakhan Oblast, a settlement in Volodarsky Selsoviet of Volodarsky District of Astrakhan Oblast
Volodarsky, Orenburg Oblast, a settlement in Volodarsky Selsoviet of Pervomaysky District of Orenburg Oblast
Volodarsky, Oryol Oblast, a settlement in Arkhangelsky Selsoviet of Uritsky District of Oryol Oblast
Volodarsky, Rostov Oblast, a khutor in Bozhkovskoye Rural Settlement of Krasnosulinsky District of Rostov Oblast
Volodarsky, Republic of Tatarstan, a settlement in Nizhnekamsky District of the Republic of Tatarstan
Volodarsky, Ulyanovsk Oblast, a settlement in Orekhovsky Rural Okrug of Radishchevsky District of Ulyanovsk Oblast
Volodarskoye, Republic of Bashkortostan, a village in Kilimovsky Selsoviet of Buzdyaksky District of the Republic of Bashkortostan
Volodarskoye, Kaluga Oblast, a village in Ferzikovsky District of Kaluga Oblast
Volodarskoye, Leningrad Oblast, a logging depot settlement in Volodarskoye Settlement Municipal Formation of Luzhsky District of Leningrad Oblast
Volodarskoye, Tver Oblast, a village in Kimrsky District of Tver Oblast
Volodarskaya, Leningrad Oblast, a village under the administrative jurisdiction of  Voznesenskoye Settlement Municipal Formation,  Podporozhsky District, Leningrad Oblast
Volodarskaya, Oryol Oblast, a village in Medvedevsky Selsoviet of Glazunovsky District of Oryol Oblast
Volodarskogo, Lipetsk Oblast, a settlement in Izmalkovsky District of Lipetsk Oblast
Volodarskogo, Moscow Oblast, a settlement in Leninsky District of Moscow Oblast